Elohim is a 1999 reggae album by the Ivorian artist Alpha Blondy.

Track listing

Personnel
Alpha Blondy – lead vocals

References

1999 albums
Alpha Blondy albums